Confessions of a Shopaholic is a 2009 American romantic comedy film based on the first two entries in the Shopaholic series of novels by Sophie Kinsella. Directed by P. J. Hogan, the film stars Isla Fisher as the shopaholic journalist and Hugh Dancy as her boss.

Plot
Rebecca "Becky" Bloomwood is a shopping addict who lives in New York City with her best friend Suze. She works as a journalist for a gardening magazine but dreams of joining the fashion magazine Alette. On the way to an interview with Alette, she tries to purchase a green scarf, but her credit card is declined. Rebecca goes to a hot dog stand and offers to buy all the hot dogs with a check if the seller gives her back change in cash, claiming that the scarf is meant to be a gift for her sick aunt. The vendor refuses but another customer gives her the $20 she needs for the scarf.

When Rebecca arrives at the interview, she's told that the position has been filled internally. However, the receptionist tells her there is an open position with the magazine Successful Saving, explaining that getting a job at Successful Saving could eventually lead to a position at Alette magazine. Rebecca interviews with Luke Brandon, the editor of Successful Saving and the man who had given her the $20. She hides her scarf outside his office, but Luke's assistant comes into the office and gives it back to her. Knowing she has been caught, Rebecca leaves.

That evening, she and Suze get drunk and write letters to Alette and Successful Saving, respectively, but in her intoxicated state she mails each to the wrong magazine. Luke likes the letter she meant to send to Alette and hires her. Rather than completing a work assignment for a new column, Rebecca goes to a clothing sale. While inspecting a cashmere coat that she had just purchased, she realizes it is not 100% cashmere and she has been duped. This gives her an idea for the column, which she writes and submits to Luke. As Rebecca is hesitant to use her real name, Luke publishes it under the moniker "The Girl in the Green Scarf."

"The Girl in The Green Scarf" becomes a huge hit among business groups, and even Rebecca's own parents advise her to read her articles. The articles are referenced in business groups in Asia, causing the Successful Saving magazine to go international. This brings much praise to Rebecca, from her peers in the workplace, and her friend Suze. "The Girl In The Green Scarf" becomes so popular that she is asked to participate in a TV interview. Rebecca meets with the editor of Alette to purchase a dress for the interview.

Rebecca later returns home to renewed confrontations with her debt collector, Derek Smeath. Suze makes her attend Shopaholics Anonymous. After purchasing dresses for her interview and Suze’s wedding, she meets a seemingly friendly woman, Miss Korch, only to learn that she is the new Shopaholics Anonymous group leader. Miss Korch forces Rebecca to donate all the clothes she just bought, not believing her when Rebecca says one of the dresses is for her friend’s wedding. After the meeting, Rebecca can't afford to buy back both dresses and buys back the interview dress, leaving the bridesmaid's dress behind. During the interview, Derek Smeath is in the audience and confronts Rebecca. Successful Saving terminates Rebecca's column after the public confrontation for bringing discredit on the magazine and believing she is a risk for not paying her debts.

Suze is furious and hurt when she finds out that Rebecca lost the bridesmaid dress. Rebecca's father, Graham, is more sympathetic, remarking that the United States has not fallen despite its gigantic national debt, and offers to sell his recreational vehicle to help her. Rebecca declines his offer, saying that he earned the camper through years of hard work and saving, and that she will need to tackle her debts on her own. Alette offers Rebecca a position at the magazine, but she declines after realizing she’d be expected to lie to the readers. Meanwhile, Luke starts a new company, Brandon Communications.

In order to earn the money to repay her debts, the members of Shopaholic Anonymous help Rebecca stage a clothes sale, which generates a lot of revenue, but not enough to retire her debts. She finally sells her green scarf when a woman bids on it for $300, making it possible for her to give all the cash to the debt collector, which she pays in pennies—to give it to him in the "most inconvenient way possible".

Rebecca makes it to the wedding after reclaiming her bridesmaid dress and Suze forgives her. After the wedding, Rebecca walks past an Yves Saint Laurent store window. She is briefly tempted to buy a new purse and dress, but eventually walks away. Rebecca then runs into Luke who returns the green scarf to her, revealing that the woman who bought it was his agent. Rebecca and Luke kiss and Rebecca begins working with Luke at his new company.

Cast

 Isla Fisher as Rebecca Bloomwood
 Hugh Dancy as Luke Brandon
 Krysten Ritter as Suze Cleath-Stuart
 John Goodman as Graham Bloomwood
 Joan Cusack as Jane Bloomwood
 John Lithgow as Edgar West
 Kristin Scott Thomas as Alette Naylor
 Leslie Bibb as Alicia Billington
 Robert Stanton as Derek Smeath
 Lynn Redgrave as a Drunken Lady at Party
 Julie Hagerty as Hayley
 Nick Cornish as Tarquin Cleath-Stuart
 Stephen Guarino as Allon
 Fred Armisen as Ryan Koenig
 Wendie Malick as Miss Korch
 Clea Lewis as Miss Ptaszinski
 John Salley as D. Freak
 Lennon Parham as Joyce
 Christine Ebersole as Morning Coffee Host
 Katherine Sigismund as Clare Edwards
 Michael Panes as Russell
 Kaitlin Hopkins as Event Planner
 Kelli Barrett as Bidder in Black/Talking Mannequin
 Kristen Connolly as Bidder in Pink
 Ilana Levine as Manhattanite
 Susan Blommaert as Orla
 Matt Servitto as Head Waiter
 Brandi Burkhardt as Sample Size Worker
 Renée Victor as Bag Lady
 Scott Evans as Chad
 Asmeret Ghebremichael as Receptionist
 Ptolemy Slocum as Borders Assistant #1
 Jenny Powers as Borders Assistant #2
 Anjali Bhimani as Girl #1
 Jonathan Tisch as Fund Manager
 Marceline Hugot as Saleswoman
 Bea Miller as Shoe Store Girl #1
 Peyton List as Shoe Store Girl #2
 Ed Helms as Garret E. Barton

Production
The film adapts the two books The Secret Dreamworld of a Shopaholic and Shopaholic Abroad which in the United States were known as Confessions of a Shopaholic and Shopaholic Takes Manhattan respectively.  The film uses the novel's American title Confessions of a Shopaholic reinterpreting Rebecca as an American rather than English.

According to DVD commentary, Lithgow turned down the role of Edgar West twice before accepting it. Armisen was approached for the West role after Lithgow initially turned it down, but after Lithgow changed his mind, the Ryan Koenig role was written for Armisen. Ed Helms was cast as Derek Smeath but scheduling conflicts prevented him from taking the role. He shot the Garret role in one day.

Filming took place in New York, Connecticut, and Florida from February to May 2008. To change the ending to be more sympathetic to audiences during a time of recession, re-shoots took place in New York City on December 4 and 8, 2008.

Production on the film also included creating a group of faux upscale brand stores at the base of the Hearst Tower. Present were brands such as Valentino, Anna Sui, Catherine Malandrino and Alberta Ferretti. Several of the costumes were from the collection of French couture designer Gilles Montezin.

Reception
Confessions of a Shopaholic received generally negative reviews from critics. On Rotten Tomatoes the film holds an approval score of 27% based on 171 reviews, with an average score of 4.40/10. The site's consensus reads: "This middling romantic comedy underutilizes a talented cast and delivers muddled messages on materialism and conspicuous consumption." On Metacritic, which assigns a normalized rating out of 100 to reviews from mainstream critics, the film holds an average score of 38 based on 30 reviews, indicating "generally unfavorable reviews".

Isla Fisher's performance generated good reviews and she was nominated for Choice Movie Actress: Comedy at the Teen Choice Awards 2009, but she lost to Anne Hathaway for Bride Wars. The film itself was also nominated for Choice Movie: Romance but lost to Twilight.

On its opening weekend without Presidents' Day, the film opened #4 behind Taken, He's Just Not That Into You, and Friday the 13th grossing $15,054,000 in 2,507 theaters with a $6,005 average. As of May 22, 2009, the film grossed $44,277,350 at the domestic box office, while its worldwide box office is $106,904,619.

Home media
The film was released by Touchstone Home Entertainment on DVD and Blu-ray on June 23, 2009 in North America and in Australia on August 5, 2009, and on Disney+ on September 17, 2021.

Soundtrack

The soundtrack of Confessions of a Shopaholic was released on February 17, 2009 under Hollywood Records. However, an alternate track listing was posted on Tommy2.net on January 25, 2009. In the alternate track listing, Adrienne Bailon also sing "Big Spender" instead of Girlicious, and the Pussycat Dolls sing "Bad Girl" instead of Rihanna featuring Chris Brown. In addition, Ric Ocasek is said to sing "Emotion in Motion" instead, and "Music of the Sun" by Rihanna has been replaced by "Calling You" by Kat DeLuna. Shontelle sings "Stuck with Each Other" with Akon for the soundtrack, Lady Gaga's "Fashion" was also in the soundtrack.

References

External links

 
 
 
 
 
 

2009 films
2009 romantic comedy films
2000s English-language films
American romantic comedy films
Films about consumerism
Films about fashion in the United States
Films based on British novels
Films based on multiple works of a series
Films directed by P. J. Hogan
Films produced by Jerry Bruckheimer
Films scored by James Newton Howard
Films set in New York City
Films shot in Connecticut
Films shot in Miami
Films shot in New York City
Hollywood Records soundtracks
Sophie Kinsella
Touchstone Pictures films
Works about magazine publishing
2000s American films